Canada and the Canadian Question is an 1891 book written by British-Canadian author Goldwin Smith that analyzes 19th-century Canada. Smith calls the country a profoundly unnatural one, with no real reason to exist. He believed that it would be far more natural for Canada and the United States to merge into a single country, with few significant differences between the two peoples.

Smith's analysis would later inspire a 1986 "update" by Peter Brimelow entitled The Patriot Game.

References
 Kelly, Stéphane; The Republic of Northern America; 26 December 2006; opinion piece; Toronto Star; Canada; (2020); accessed September 2015.

1891 non-fiction books
Books about politics of Canada